County Road 682 is a road in the municipalities of Aure (in Møre og Romsdal county) and Heim (in Trøndelag county) in Norway. In addition to its  land length, the route also includes a  ferry connection.

The road branches off from County Road 680 at Espset and runs south across the island of Ertvågsøy, first along the east shore of Foldfjord and then along the east shore of the lake Skausetvatnet. County Road 362 branches off to the east at Vågosen just before the road reaches the ferry dock at Arasvika. There the route continues via ferry across Arasvik Fjord to Hennset, where it joins European route E39. The road is also named Arasvikvegen (Arasvika Road) for its entire length.

Prior to January 1, 2010, the route was a national road, but control and maintenance of the road was transferred to the counties from the national government on that date, and so now it is a county road.

References

External links
Statens vegvesen – trafikkmeldinger Fv682 (Traffic Information: County Road 682)

682
Aure, Norway
Heim, Norway